The 1985 British League season was the 51st season of the top tier of speedway in the United Kingdom and the 21st known as the British League.

Team changes
Wimbledon Dons dropped to the National league, this was the first time that Wimbledon would not compete in the top tier of speedway.

Summary
Oxford Cheetahs won the league and cup double. The Oxford team, financed by the Oxford Stadium owners Northern Sports and headed by David Hawkins was the most expensive team assembled in the history of the league. The team included Danish international Hans Nielsen (signed for a record £30,000) in 1984. Nielsen had topped the previous season's averages on Oxford's return to the league and was imperious during 1985, finishing with an exceptional average, way ahead of any other rider. The team eased to the league title by a clear ten points, with Simon Wigg, Andy Grahame, Marvyn Cox, Jens Rasmussen and Melvyn Taylor all riding over 50 matches each during the season.

Defending champions Ipswich Witches finished mid-table which was not surprising taking into account that just three matches into the season their leading rider Billy Sanders committed suicide on 23 April. The news shocked the club and the wider speedway world at the time.

Final table
M = Matches; W = Wins; D = Draws; L = Losses; Pts = Total Points

British League Knockout Cup
The 1985 Speedway Star British League Knockout Cup was the 47th edition of the Knockout Cup for tier one teams. Oxford Cheetahs were the winners.

First round

Quarter-finals

Semi-finals

Final

First leg

Second leg

Oxford Cheetahs were declared Knockout Cup Champions, winning on aggregate 79-76.

League Cup
The League Cup was contested as a league format. Coventry Bees won the final over two legs defeating Oxford Cheetahs 86-70 on aggregrate.

Qualifying table

Semi-finals

Final

Leading final averages

Riders & final averages
Belle Vue

 9.77
 8.92
	7.59
 6.16
 5.83
 4.90
 4.36
 3.33
 1.33
 1.10

Coventry

 10.13 
 9.09
 6.68
 6.12
 5.93
 5.76
 4.11
 3.41

Cradley Heath

 10.38
 7.93 
 7.91
 7.37 
 6.21
 5.41
 4.26
 1.23
 1.20

Halifax

 10.13
 7.26
 6.62
 6.17
 5.41
 5.40
 5.16
 4.19

Ipswich

 9.33 
 9.12 
 8.12 
 6.14
 5.47
 5.16
 5.10
 3.07
 2.38

King's Lynn

 7.80
 7.20
 6.19
 6.12
 5.91
 5.76
 4.84
 4.54

Oxford

 11.35
 9.10
 7.18
 6.07
 6.07
 4.87
 4.78
 2.22

Reading

 9.43 
 9.01
 6.79
 6.33
 6.33
 5.59
 5.57
 4.72
 4.67
 2.05

Sheffield

 10.39 
 7.33
 6.91
 6.81
 6.33
 5.85
 5.50
 4.22
 3.34

Swindon

 9.35 
 8.92
 7.90
 6.54
 6.31
 5.54
 5.40
 5.02
 .3.69
 1.71

Wolverhampton

 9.80
 7.72
 7.69
 7.42
 4.97
 4.89
 4.79
 3.88
 2.00

See also
 Speedway in the United Kingdom
 List of United Kingdom Speedway League Champions
 Knockout Cup (speedway)

References

British League
1985 in British motorsport
1985 in speedway